Garegin (Armenian : Գարեգին), also pronounced Karekin (in Western Armenian), may refer to :

Religious figures
Armenian Catholicoi
 Garegin I or Karekin I (1932-1999), a Catholicos of the Armenian Apostolic Church, first as Catholicos Garegin II of the Holy See of Cilicia (1983-1994) and then as Catholicos of All Armenians Garegin I of the Mother See of Holy Etchmiadzin of the Armenian Apostolic Church (1995-1999) 
 Garegin II or Karekin II (born 1951), Catholicos of All Armenians at the Mother See of Holy Etchmiadzin of the Armenian Apostolic Church
 Garegin I (Cilicia) or Karekin I (Cilicia) (1867-1952), a Catholicos of Cilicia of the Armenian Apostolic Church from 1943 to 1952
Armenian Patriarchs
Karekin I Khachadourian of Constantinople (1880–1961), the 81st Armenian Patriarch of Constantinople
Karekin II Kazanjian of Constantinople (1927–1998), the 83rd Armenian Patriarch of Constantinople

Given name

Garegin
(Mostly used in Eastern Armenian) 
 Garegin Khachatryan (1975–1995), an Armenian sculptor, artist and freedom fighter
 Garegin Nzhdeh (1886-1955), an Armenian statesman, fedayee, political thinker, revolutionary militant leader

Karekin
(Mostly used in Western Armenian)
Karekin Arutyunov (1964), Ukrainian politician
Karekin Deveciyan (1868–1964), Turkish-Armenia zoologist
Karekin Khajag (born 1867–1915), Armenian journalist
Karekin Pastermadjian, (born 1872–1923), Armenian politician
Karekin Simonian (born 1932), referee
Karekin Yarian, author and social activist from San Francisco

See also
Karekin I (disambiguation)
Karekin II (disambiguation)